Driggs–Reed Memorial Airport  is a city-owned public-use airport located one nautical mile (1.85 km) north of the central business district of Driggs, a city in Teton County, Idaho, United States. This airport is included in the FAA's National Plan of Integrated Airport Systems for 2009–2013, which categorized it as a general aviation facility.

Although many U.S. airports use the same three-letter location identifier for the FAA and IATA, this facility is assigned DIJ by the FAA but has no designation from the IATA (which assigned DIJ to Dijon Airport in Dijon, France).

Facilities and aircraft operations 
It has one runway designated 4/22 with an asphalt surface measuring 7,300 by 100 feet (2,225 x 30 m).

For the 12-month period ending July 8, 2013, the airport had 8,000 aircraft operations, an average of 22 per day: 86.3% general aviation and 13.7% air taxi. At that time there were 90 aircraft based at this airport: 69% single-engine, 6% multi-engine, 12% jet, 2% helicopter and 11% glider.

References

External links 
 Driggs–Reed Memorial (DIJ) at Idaho Transportation Department
 Teton Aviation Center, the fixed-base operator (FBO)
 Aerial image as of 23 July 1999 from USGS The National Map
 

Airports in Idaho
Buildings and structures in Teton County, Idaho
Transportation in Teton County, Idaho